The International Kickboxing Federation (IKF) is a sanctioning body for kickboxing and Muay Thai based in the United States. The IKF sanctions and regulates all aspects of these sports from Semi Contact ( IKF Point Kickboxing (IKF/PKB) ) to Full Contact in both Amateur and professional levels. The IKF World Headquarters located in Newcastle, California, USA oversees over 2,000 IKF events a year around the world.

Styles
IKF sanctions and regulates both professional and amateur Kickboxing and Muay Thai around the world in six different rule styles:
American Kickboxing: Above the Waist
International Rules: Leg Kicks Allowed
Muay Thai: Allowing Knees and Elbows
Unified Rules: Modified/Limited Muay Thai - K-1 - Glory Style Rules Combined. Limited Knees - Clinch ONLY If followed By Immediate Strike
Point Kickboxing: Semi-Contact ( www.IKFPKB.com )
Sanshou: All of the above along with Throws

The IKF has also introduced new styles over the years: 
Modified Muay Thai: Prohibiting Knees and Elbows to the Head but Allowing Knees to the Body or Limited Clinching
Xtreme Gladiator: Muay Thai, MMA & Sanshou with a 30-second time limit for ground fighting

The IKF has both male and female titles (State, Regional, National, Continental, Intercontinental and World) and both Pro and Amateur rankings.

History 
In 1992, Steve Fossum and Dan Stell founded the IKF, based on their knowledge and experience as former kickboxers, trainers and event promoters.

In July, of 1996, Mr. Stell stepped down as the IKF Vice President to pursue other desires, staying on as Head of Officials. In December 1996, the IKF launched a website with news updates for various events, worldwide rankings, rules and regulations.

In 1998, the IKF expanded into the United Kingdom and began sanctioning events in England, Scotland, Wales, Ireland and other European countries.

In 2007, Neil Holden took the position of Director for IKF Europe for a while. Replacing Holden was Carl Sams and Colin Payne, both previously in charge of IKF Full Contact activity in the United Kingdom. Both are part of the IKF Europe Team. They are currently foCusing on growth and activity in the United Kingdom as Co-Directors for IKF Europe under all IKF rule styles.

The IKF has developed into a global organization under the direction of Steve Fossum and others associated with the IKF World Team. Along with this growth was the creation of the IKF Amateur Tournaments. The IKF created the first amateur kickboxing tournament in the United States in 1999, the IKF USA National Championships.  The annual event grew to a North American Championships in 2004 and eventually into the IKF World Classic in 2006. Today the IKF World Classic is one of the largest all AMATEUR Muay Thai and Kickboxing Championship tournaments in the world.

Fossum is also the President of the first ever Mixed Martial Arts (MMA) sanctioning body, International Sport Combat Federation (ISCF) and is the President and CEO of The International Fight Sports (IFS) which oversees several Fight Sport Companies who have a mutual goal of fostering national and international Professional and Amateur fight sport competition through the sanctioning of Fight Sports.

Regulations
IKF Rules & Regulations cover all medical requirements from the fighter to the ringside medical staff.
The IKF requires a doctor and at least two paramedics equipped with resuscitation equipment to be on site for all sanctioned events.

On March 17, 2014, the California State Athletic Commission officially delegated to the IKF, International Kickboxing Federation the exclusive authority to regulate Amateur Kickboxing and Muay Thai (Ages 8 and Up) in the State of California.

Weight Classes (Adult)

References

External links 
 
IKF Pro & Amateur World Rankings
Past IKF Amateur Champions
Past IKF Pro Champions
The International Kickboxing Federation Rules & Regulations Page
 
 

Kickboxing organizations
Organizations established in 1992
Organizations based in California